Lela Margaret Ann Evans is a Canadian politician, who was elected to the Newfoundland and Labrador House of Assembly in the 2019 provincial election. She represents the electoral district of Torngat Mountains as a New Democrat, having previously been elected as a Progressive Conservative. She was re-elected in the 2021 provincial election.

Evans has over 20 years’ experience in the environmental field including environmental assessments, mining and construction.

Biography 

Evans was born in Makkovik, a community in Nunatsiavut, Labrador and she is of Norwegian and Inuit descent. Evans is the daughter of Annie Evans and niece of feminist activist Ruth Flowers. In 2016, Evans joined protests against the Lower Churchill Project despite working for the company developing the project, Nalcor Energy. Evans has also worked as a first-aid instructor and at the Voisey's Bay Mine. Evans has also served as a part of a team conducting community consultations on the Uranium mining moratorium in northern Labrador. Evans is a graduate of the Memorial University of Newfoundland.

Evans is openly lesbian.

Politics 
In an interview with The Independent, Evans stated that she had to quit her job to run as a candidate in the 2019 election because her employer would not allow her to take a leave of absence. She was nominated as the Progressive Conservative candidate against her cousin and MHA Randy Edmunds. Evans went on to defeat Edmunds in an upset. She considered herself to be "putting the P in PC," meaning that she considers herself to be progressive in her political beliefs.

Evans has called for the Trans-Labrador Highway to be extended to reach communities in the northern part of Labrador.

On October 25, 2021, Evans left the PC Party to sit as an Independent in the House of Assembly. On March 7, 2022, Evans joined the NDP.

Election results

References

Living people
Progressive Conservative Party of Newfoundland and Labrador MHAs
Women MHAs in Newfoundland and Labrador
21st-century Canadian women politicians
Inuit politicians
Lesbian politicians
Newfoundland and Labrador New Democratic Party MHAs
21st-century Canadian politicians
People from Makkovik
Canadian LGBT people in provincial and territorial legislatures
Inuit from Newfoundland and Labrador
Conservation biologists
Independent MHAs in Newfoundland and Labrador
Year of birth missing (living people)
21st-century Canadian LGBT people